Children of Heaven is a 1997 Iranian family drama film written and directed by Majid Majidi. It deals with a brother and sister, and their adventures over a lost pair of shoes. It was nominated for the Academy Award for Best Foreign Language Film in 1998.

Plot
The film starts with Ali fetching his little sister Zahra's pink shoes after a cobbler has repaired them. He leaves them unattended to buy some potatoes. While he is pre-occupied, a homeless man picks up the shoes, hidden in a bag, thinking it was garbage and takes them away. Frantic to find them, the young boy, thinking the shoes fell behind the crates, knocks over plates of vegetables and is chased away by the grocer.

Ali's family lives in a poor South Tehran neighbourhood, and are having financial trouble, so he fears to tell his parents about the mishap. The landlord argues with Ali's mother because she is five months behind on the rent, and the grocer has not been paid in a while either. Ali tells Zahra about the shoes and begs her not to tell their mother; she agrees. That night, Ali's father scolds him for not helping his ill mother when she asked. While the siblings were doing their homework, they passed notes to each other discussing what to do. They devise a scheme to share Ali's Converse sneakers: Zahra will wear them to school in the morning and return them to Ali at midday so he can attend afternoon classes. Ali does well on a test and his teacher awards him a gold-colored pen with the others in his class that got good grades; he gives it to Zahra to partially make up for losing her shoes. However, the uncomfortable arrangement between him and his sister leads to Ali being late three times in a row, no matter how hard he runs; the first time the principal ignores him, the second time he gives him a warning, the third time he tells Ali to leave and return with his father who is at work trying to make money. Ali's teacher, noticing Ali's tears, persuades the principal that Ali is at the top of his class and to give the boy one more chance and let him back into class.

One day, Zahra notices her missing pink shoes on another student, Roya's feet. After class, Zahra secretly follows Roya home. She later brings Ali with her for a confrontation, but from hiding, they discover that Roya's father is blind, so they decide to leave. When Roya does well in her studies, her father buys her new violet shoes and throws away Zahra's. Zahra is dismayed when she finds out from her new friend.

Ali's father, anxious to earn more money, borrows some gardening equipment and heads off with Ali to the rich suburbs of North Tehran to find some gardening work. They try many places without success, though Ali proves to be a great help to his tongue-tied father. Finally, they come upon a mansion in which a six-year-old boy named Alireza lives under the care of his grandfather. While Ali plays with Alireza, his father works. When he is finished, Ali's father is surprised and elated by how generous the grandfather is. On the way home, Ali mentions in passing that Zahra could use a new pair of shoes; his father says that new shoes for his children is a good idea, however, their elation is short lived as their bicycle's brakes fail and the father is injured in the resulting crash.

Finally, Ali learns of a high-profile children's 4 kilometer footrace involving many schools; the third prize is one week at a vacation camp and a pair of sneakers. Ali sees this as his chance to earn a new pair of shoes for Zahra. To his bitter disappointment, in a hard-fought dash to the finish, he accidentally places first instead. Ali returns home where Zahra is waiting for him. However, before he can reveal to his sister his disappointment in his placement in the race, she is called away by their mother. In a separate scene, there is a quick shot of the children's father's bicycle as he's riding home, showing a pair of white and a pair of pink shoes among his purchases. In the final shot, Ali is dejected as his sneakers are torn from the race—he is then shown dipping his bare blistered feet in a pool.

Some versions include an epilogue revealing that Ali eventually achieves success in a racing career.

Cast
 Amir Farrokh Hashemian as Ali
 Bahare Seddiqi as Zahra
 Reza Naji as Father
 Fereshte Sarabandi as Mother
 Dariush Mokhtari as Ali's teacher
 Nafise Jafar-Mohammadi as Roya
 Mohammed-Hasan Hosseinian as Roya's father
 Mohammed-Hossein Shahidi as Alireza
 Kazem Asqarpoor as Grandfather
 Christopher Maleki as Salt seller

Production
The film was shot in Tehran. It was attempted to keep the filming secret in order to capture a more realistic image of the city. The production costs have been estimated at US$180,000. The film was distributed by Miramax.

Release

Box office
Children of Heaven premiered in February 1997 at the Tehran Fajr Film Festival and was awarded several national film awards. It opened in the US on January 22, 1999, and earned a US box office total of $933,933. The worldwide total was $1,628,579.

Critical reception
Critical response to the film was highly positive. Some critics compared it to Vittorio de Sica's Bicycle Thieves (1948). Roger Ebert's review in the Chicago Sun-Times called it "very nearly a perfect movie for children" that "lacks the cynicism and smart-mouth attitudes of so much American entertainment for kids and glows with a kind of good-hearted purity".

In 1998, it became the first Iranian film to be nominated for an Academy Award for Best Foreign Language Film, losing to the Italian film Life Is Beautiful by Roberto Benigni. The majority of its US earnings came after the nomination was announced. After the film had become well known worldwide due to the Oscar nomination, it was shown in several European, South American, and Asian countries between 1999 and 2001. It was successfully shown in numerous film festivals and won awards at the Fajr Film Festival, the World Film Festival, the Newport International Film Festival, the Warsaw International Film Festival, and the Singapore International Film Festival. It competed for the Grand Prize at the American Film Institute's festival of 1997.

While watching the film, Singaporean filmmaker Jack Neo and his wife were moved to "holding hands and crying after seeing the love shared by the children". Children of Heaven inspired Neo to explore issues faced by Singaporean youths in his 2002 film I Not Stupid.

Home media 
In the United Kingdom, the film was watched by 100,000 viewers on ITV1 in 2008, making it the year's most-watched foreign-language film on ITV. It was later watched by 100,000 UK viewers on ITV1 in 2009, again making it the year's most-watched foreign-language film on ITV. Combined, the film drew a  UK viewership on ITV1 between 2008 and 2009.

See also
 Homerun, a 2003 Singaporean film by Jack Neo, is an adaptation of Children of Heaven, but its theme is friendship and it is set in 1965 Singapore.
 Bumm Bumm Bole, a 2010 Indian Hindi film by Priyadarshan, and starring Darsheel Safary, is entirely based on Children of Heaven.
 Akka Kuruvi, a 2022 Indian Tamil film by Samy, is the official remake of Children of Heaven.
 List of submissions to the 71st Academy Awards for Best Foreign Language Film
 List of Iranian submissions for the Academy Award for Best Foreign Language Film

References

External links
 Children of Heaven at director's website
 
 
 
 
 Interview with Majid Majidi

1997 films
1997 drama films
1997 independent films
Iranian drama films
1990s Persian-language films
Iranian children's films
Films about children
Films about families
Films about siblings
Films directed by Majid Majidi
Films set in Tehran
Films shot in Iran
Iranian independent films
Films whose director won the Best Directing Crystal Simorgh
Crystal Simorgh for Best Film winners
Films whose writer won the Best Screenplay Crystal Simorgh